In Lesotho some roads are designated as numbered routes to help with navigation. There is a nationwide numbering scheme consisting of A, B, C and D routes.

Numbering 
In the nationwide numbering scheme, routes are divided into a hierarchy of four categories: A roads which are the most important routes connecting major cities. B roads, which connecting smaller cities and towns to the national route network, C roads connecting with B roads and D roads connecting to C roads

 Main Routes: A1 to A99
 Regional Routes: B1 to B99
 Local Routes: C1 to C999
 Minor Routes: D1 to D9999

Lists of routes 

 Main Routes (Lesotho)
 Regional Routes (Lesotho)
 Local Routes (Lesotho)
 Minor Routes (Lesotho)

References 

Roads in Lesotho